The Thirteen Assyrian Fathers were, according to Georgian church tradition, a group of monastic missionaries who arrived from Mesopotamia to Georgia to strengthen Christianity in the country in the 6th century. They are credited by the Georgian church historians with the foundation of several monasteries and hermitages and initiation of the ascetic movement in Georgia.

The lives of the Assyrian Fathers are related in a cycle of medieval Georgian hagiographic texts and are unattested beyond these sources. Some of these vitae are formalities composed for an 18th-century synaxary, but four of them exist in original form, as well a metaphrastic version. The dating as well as authorship of these texts is controversial. The Georgian Catholicoi Arsen I (830-87) and Arsen II (955-80) have been suggested as authors of some of the vitae. Other, unattributed, texts may have been composed earlier, in the late 7th century.

Many monasteries in modern Georgia are named after the Assyrian Fathers and are said to have been founded and led by them and their numerous disciples. In the Middle Ages, these religious foundations played an important role in forging Georgian Christian identity.

Tradition, written and oral, names as many as 19 Assyrian monks active in Georgia in the 6th century and the number "13" seems to be largely symbolic. Modern scholarly opinion is divided as to whether they were Assyrians, Assyrian-educated Georgians, whether missionaries or refugees — miaphysite or diophysite — from Syria, from which miaphysitism had retreated while Georgia was still primarily miaphysite at that time.

Chief of the Assyrian Fathers were:

 Davit Garejeli (დავით გარეჯელი) / David of Gareja
 Ioane Zedazneli (იოანე ზედაზნელი) / John of Zedazeni
 Abibos Nekreseli (აბიბოს ნეკრესელი) / Abibos of Nekresi
 Shio Mgvimeli (შიო მღვიმელი) / Shio of Mgvime
 Ioseb Alaverdeli (იოსებ ალავერდელი) / Joseph of Alaverdi
 Anton Martkopeli (ანტონ მარტყოფელი) / Anton of Martkopi
 Tadeoz Stepantsmindeli (თადეოზ სტეფანწმინდელი) / Thaddeus of Stepantsminda
 Piros Breteli (პიროს ბრეთელი) / Pyrrhus of Breti
 Iese Tsilkneli (იესე წილკნელი) / Jesse of Tsilkani
 Stepane Khirseli (სტეფანე ხირსელი) / Stephen of Khirsa
 Isidore Samtavneli (ისიდორე სამთავნელი) / Isidor of Samtavisi
 Mikael Ulumboeli (მიქაელ ულუმბოელი) / Michael of Ulumbo
 Zenon Ikaltoeli (ზენონ იყალთოელი) / Zenon of Ikalto

See also
 Nine Saints

External links
The Yezidi Kurds and Assyrians of Georgia, Journal of the Central Asia & the Caucasus, Iraklii Chikhladze, Giga Chikhladze. (3/21/2003)
Following the way of Assyrian Holy Fathers
The Assyrians of Georgia: Ethnic Specifics Should be Reserved
David Gareji Monasteries and Hermitage from Unesco

References

Saints of Georgia (country)
Syriac Christians
Christian monks from Georgia (country)
Old Georgian literature
6th-century Christian saints
6th-century Christian monks